Aitha is a village in Varanasi district in the Indian state of Uttar Pradesh. It is about 312 kilometers from the state capital Lucknow and 806 kilometers from the national capital Delhi.

Demography
Aitha has a total population of 2,398 people amongst 354 families. Sex ratio of Aitha is 884 and child sex ratio is 917. Uttar Pradesh state average for both ratios is 912 and 902 respectively.

Transportation
Aitha can be accessed by road only as it does not have a railway station. Closest railway station to this village is Sarnath (8 km). Nearest operational airports are Varanasi airport (18 kilometers) and Allahabad Airports (143 kilometers).

See also

Notes 

  All demographic data is based on 2011 Census of India.

References 

Villages in Varanasi district